Ambroise Nelson Félicitet (born 29 May 1993) is a Martiniquais professional footballer who plays as a defender for the club Aiglon du Lamentin, and the Martinique national team.

International career
Reuperné debuted with the Martinique national team in a 1–1 CONCACAF Nations League loss to Trinidad and Tobago on 6 September 2019. He was called up to represent Martinique at the 2021 CONCACAF Gold Cup.

References

External links
 
 

1993 births
Living people
Martiniquais footballers
Martinique international footballers
Association football defenders
2021 CONCACAF Gold Cup players